There are numerous artworks on permanent public display in Western Australia.

This list include only works of public art accessible in an outdoor public space; it does not include artwork on display inside a museum. Most of the works mentioned are sculptures, although several notable memorials are listed also. Public art may include statues, sculptures, monuments, memorials, murals and mosaics.

In 1989 the Western Australian state government established a "Percent for Art" policy. The scheme which enacts the policy is administered by the Department of Culture and the Arts and requires that up to one percent of the construction budget for new public works over $2,000,000, be expended on public artwork. The Town of Vincent was the first Local government authority to have a similar scheme. It requires that "commercial, non-residential, and/or mixed residential/commercial developments over $1,000,000 are to set aside a minimum of one per cent of the estimated total project cost for the development to be used for public artworks." Over 700 works have been installed under the state government scheme since 1989.

Perth CBD 
Includes public artworks in the Perth CBD. Excludes the Northbridge precinct and the Perth Cultural Centre, Kings Park, East Perth and Claisebrook Cove.

Northbridge/Perth Cultural Centre 
Public artworks in the Northbridge precinct and around Perth Cultural Centre.

East Perth and Claisebrook Cove
Since the late 1980s, a major urban renewal project surrounding Claisebrook Cove has been underway, with abandoned industrial sites levelled and replaced with residential streetscapes and landscaped waterfronts. These have been interspersed with a good collection of public art.

Kings Park 
The following list includes public artworks in Kings Park which is located on the outskirts of the Perth CBD. Kings Park was established as a public park in 1872 and contains a varied collection of public artworks ranging from early 20th century war monuments to life-sized dinosaur models. It is said to contain "more memorials, statues and honour avenues than any other park in Australia".

South Perth 

Public artworks within the City of South Perth.

Fremantle 
Public artworks within the City of Fremantle.

Other metropolitan
Public artworks in the Perth metropolitan area and outside the Perth CBD and Kings Park.

Regional 
Includes artworks in Western Australian country and regional centres.

Notes

Further reading
Public art a feature of Perth and Fremantle. In Transwa Express, Mar–Apr 2004, p. 4–5,

External links
 Slideshows of Perth public sculptures (including many not in the list) and classic architecture – 400 pictures of sculptures

Lists of buildings and structures in Western Australia
Western Australia
Culture of Western Australia
Public art in Western Australia
Lists of tourist attractions in Western Australia